This is a list of films produced in Hong Kong ordered by decade and year of release in separate pages. For film set in Hong Kong and produced elsewhere see List of films set in Hong Kong.

1909–1949
List of Hong Kong films before 1950

1950s
List of Hong Kong films of the 1950s

1960s
List of Hong Kong films of the 1960s

1970s
List of Hong Kong films of the 1970s

1980s
List of Hong Kong films of the 1980s

1990s
List of Hong Kong films of the 1990s

2000s
List of Hong Kong films of the 2000s

2010s
List of Hong Kong films of the 2010s

2020s
List of Hong Kong films of the 2020s

See also
Cinema of Hong Kong
List of films set in Hong Kong

External links
 IMDB list of Hong Kong films

 
Lists of films by country of production